LaCenterra at Cinco Ranch  is an upscale 34-acre, 300,000 square foot Main Street style mixed-use development, with 271,000 square feet of retail and restaurant space. It is located at the Grand Parkway and Cinco Ranch Blvd, in Cinco Ranch, Texas. It also includes office space and apartments. This lifestyle center serves as the conventional mall for Greater Katy.

Buildings and structures in Fort Bend County, Texas
Shopping malls in Greater Houston
Shopping malls established in 2007
2007 establishments in Texas
Lifestyle centers (retail)